Toby Hadoke (born 2 January 1974) is an English actor, writer, stand-up comedian and comedy promoter. He is known for his work on the Manchester comedy circuit, where he performs regularly, and as a prominent fan of the television series Doctor Who. He runs the XS Malarkey comedy club, and is involved with many comedy nights in the region.  His comedy tends towards the topical and/or political.

Early years 
Born in between Ludlow and Bridgnorth in Shropshire, he grew up in Loughton. He was educated at Ludlow C.E. School and Ludlow 6th Form College before reading English and Drama at the University of Manchester, where he first dabbled in stand-up comedy.

Stand-up career 
Hadoke runs the XS Malarkey Comedy Club in Manchester. This began in 1997 at Scruffy Murphys, Fallowfield (where the night was called Murphy's Malarkey), before moving (in 2001) over the road to Bar XS (renamed Remedy in 2008). XS Malarkey then moved to the Bread Shed, behind the Flour and Flagon on Grosvenor Street. In 2023 it was announced the club night would relocate to CANVAS at Circle Square.

Hadoke is the regular compere for the night, which he runs on a non-profit making basis.  Acts who have played there include Peter Kay, Mick Miller, Chris Addison, Sarah Millican, Phill Jupitus, Dave Spikey, Jimmy Carr, Reginald D Hunter, Sarah Kendall, Seymour Mace and John Oliver.

The club also gave early breaks to Alan Carr, Justin Moorhouse and Jason Manford.

Hadoke appears regularly at The Comedy Store and The Frog and Bucket comedy clubs in Manchester.

Hadoke is a founding member of the Comedy Store sketch troupe The Unbroadcastable Radio Show.

Hadoke has performed as part of Robin Ince's Book Club on several occasions, including at The Edinburgh Festival Fringe.

Hadoke won the inaugural Les Dawson Award for Services To Comedy at the 2003 Manchester Comedy Festival (beating a shortlist including Peter Kay, Johnny Vegas, Caroline Aherne, Dave Spikey and Ken Dodd).

Hadoke is also the Resident Compere at the Limelight Comedy Club (Previously the Ribbed Comedy Club) at the Limelight Club on Hightown in Crewe, Cheshire.  He was also the compere at Ribbed 2 (Ribbed Squared) at Square One, Mill Street, Crewe.

In 2008 he won the Chortle Award for Best Off-Stage Contribution for his work promoting comedy in the North West and at XS Malarkey.

In 2009, Hadoke appeared in the UK tour of the hit American improv show, Totally Looped.

Moths Ate My Doctor Who Scarf 

His first one-man show, Moths Ate My Doctor Who Scarf, was at the 2006 Edinburgh Festival Fringe.

In 2007, it continued to tour, visiting Bath, Glasgow, Salford, Hemel Hempstead before returning to the Edinburgh Fringe for one week only.

In 2008, the show embarked on a much larger tour, starting in Ireland in January and finishing in Basingstoke in November. In April 2008 it enjoyed at two week run at London's West End, at The Arts Theatre, Leicester Square. During the London run, David Tennant provided a vocal cameo for the show which has been included in all subsequent performances.

Moths Ate My Doctor Who Scarf continued to tour the UK in 2009, with international appearances in Los Angeles, at the New Zealand Comedy Festival, Toronto and Florida.

A full cast adaptation of Moths Ate My Doctor Who Scarf was recorded in May 2007 and broadcast on digital channel BBC7 in July, prior to a BBC Audiobooks CD release. It featured Hadoke as himself narrating, with guest appearances from Doctor Who actors Colin Baker and Louise Jameson, plus comedian Alfie Joey and Early Doors actor James Quinn as The Voice Of The BBC. It received a five star review from SFX magazine and was nominated as Best Drama in the 2008 Sony Awards.

A sequel show, My Stepson Stole My Sonic Screwdriver, was performed at the 2012 Edinburgh Fringe Festival.

On 17 November 2013 at the Garrick Theatre in London, Hadoke performed a double bill of both shows, which were recorded for future DVD release.

Other Doctor Who work
Hadoke's website lists a collection of ten connections with Doctor Who, including having a character named after him in Dale Smith's novel Heritage.

He has moderated the DVD commentaries for many Doctor Who stories, including The Rescue and The Romans (released in 2009 as a box set); The Curse of Peladon and The Monster of Peladon (released together in 2010); The Time Monster (released in 2010 as part of the "Myths and Legends" box set); The Dominators (released 2010); The Ark (released 2011); and The Krotons (released 2012). He also appeared in the special feature "Robophobia" for the Special Edition of The Robots of Death (released 2012).

In 2009, Hadoke collaborated with writer Rob Shearman to watch and comment on every episode of Doctor Who from the programme's debut in 1963 to David Tennant's final story. The resulting discussions are being published as Running Through Corridors: Rob and Toby's Marathon Watch of Doctor Who, a three-volume series from Mad Norwegian Press. The first volume, covering the 1960s, was published in 2010; the second volume, covering the 1970s, was published in 2016.

Hadoke appears as a bartender in a cameo appearance in An Adventure in Space and Time, a docudrama detailing the early history of Doctor Who.

Hadoke has been contributing obituaries to The Guardian since 2002, often for Doctor Who-related figures.

Acting career 
His television appearances include Phoenix Nights, Coronation Street, Titanic - Birth Of A Legend, Shameless, A & E, Casualty 1907, The Royal Today, and The Forsyte Saga.

Hadoke has also appeared in two short films - Date Jà Vu and The Man Who Dreamt of Stars.

His theatre credits include work with the Royal Exchange Theatre, Manchester, The Dukes Theatre, Lancaster, and Opera North.

Hadoke has written for The Guardian and The Independent and is a frequent broadcaster on BBC Radio.

Personal life 
Hadoke has a son named Louis from a previous relationship. His partner is actress Cherylee Houston.

References

External links 
XS Malarkey website
Official Toby Hadoke Website

The Unbroadcastable Radio Show homepage

1974 births
Hadoke,Toby
English male comedians
English male stage actors
English male television actors
Living people
21st-century English male actors
21st-century English male writers
Actors from Shropshire
Comedians from Shropshire
Writers from Shropshire